Kan Fook-yee, GBS (born 14 June 1936, Hong Kong) was the member of the Provisional Legislative Council. He is a member of the Hong Kong Institute of Surveyors, fellow of the Chartered Institute of Arbitrators and Royal Institution of Charter Surveyors. He joined the Hong Kong Basic Law Consultative Committee in the 1980s and the Preparatory Committee for the Hong Kong Special Administrative Region in the 1990s. He was also the senior partner of the Knight Frank (HK).

References

1936 births
Living people
Members of the Provisional Legislative Council
New Hong Kong Alliance politicians
Progressive Hong Kong Society politicians
Members of the Selection Committee of Hong Kong
Members of the Preparatory Committee for the Hong Kong Special Administrative Region
Hong Kong surveyors
Hong Kong Basic Law Consultative Committee members
Hong Kong Affairs Advisors
Delegates to the 8th National People's Congress from Hong Kong
Delegates to the 9th National People's Congress from Hong Kong
Delegates to the 10th National People's Congress from Hong Kong
Recipients of the Gold Bauhinia Star
Recipients of the Silver Bauhinia Star